Youhanna Fouad El-Hage (born 13 March 1939 in Zahle, Lebanon - died on 4 May 2005) was a Lebanese Archeparch of the Maronite Catholic Archeparchy of Tripoli in Lebanon and President of the Caritas Lebanon.

Life
On March 17, 1968 El-Hage was ordained priest. He studied in Rome, in the United States and in Beirut. On 7 June 1997, El-Hage was appointed Maronite Archbishop of Tripoli in Northern Lebanon. His episcopal consecration took place on 1 November 1997 by the hands of the Maronite Patriarch of Antioch, Cardinal Nasrallah Boutros Sfeir, and his co-consecrators were Roland Aboujaoudé, Titular bishop of Antioch and Georges Scandar, Eparch of Zahleh.

In Lebanon, he was known as "bishop of the poor" by Christians and Muslims.

El-Hage died on May 4, 2005.

Other activities
 President of Caritas in Lebanon.
 President of Caritas MONA (Middle East / North Africa).
 Since 1999, President of the worldwide Caritas network (Caritas Internationalis), which consists of 162 national Caritas organizations.

External links

 http://www.catholic-hierarchy.org/bishop/belhage.html
 http://www.gcatholic.org/dioceses/diocese/trip1.htm

1939 births
2005 deaths
Lebanese Maronites
21st-century Maronite Catholic bishops
People from Zahle
20th-century Maronite Catholic bishops